Christopher Strauss de León (born October 31, 1956) is a Philippine film actor and politician. He is recognized as the “King of Philippine Drama” has appeared in over 120 films since the early 1970s.

Regarded as an "acting genius" and one of the pillars of the industry, De Leon is a recipient of the prestigious “Ulirang Artista Lifetime Achievement Award” at the 27th PMPC Star Awards. He has won 7 FAMAS Awards including five "Best Actor" wins and a Hall of Fame trophy. He has also won 2 Gawad Urian Awards, 4 FAP Awards and an MMFF Hall of Fame plaque.

On June 30, 2010, he was sworn into office as the board member of the 2nd district of Batangas.

Early life and education
De Leon is the son of Gil de León and Lilia Dizon. He is of German Jewish descent from his maternal grandfather. On May 11, 1999, he was given a US Certificate of Citizenship. The U.S. Certificate of Citizenship says that the holder was a U.S. Citizen at birth. His citizenship was passed through his maternal grandfather and his mother. He studied fine arts at the University of the East in Manila.

Acting career
In the 1980s to 1990s, he was part of the all-male show Goin' Bananas with veteran actors Jay Ilagan and Johnny Delgado and Edgar Mortiz.

In September 1990, de Leon was reportedly cast in a film based on the song "Anak" by Freddie Aguilar. It would have been directed by Willy Milan, and starred Susan Lozada, Orestes Ojeda, and Dinah Dominguez in addition to de Leon, but the film went unreleased.

In 2000, he hosted the first Philippine version of the quiz show Who Wants to Be a Millionaire? (also known as WW2BAM) on IBC until 2002.

In 2003–2004, he became part of GMA-7 primetime soap/television series ensemble Ang Iibigin ay Ikaw which became successful and continued with Ang Iibigin ay Ikaw Pa Rin. with fellow actors Alice Dixson and Lani Mercado who he both starred in a 1992 film entitled My Other Woman with Richard Gomez.

In 2005, he became part of the very successful television franchise of Mars Ravelo's Darna as Dr. Zombie.

In 2006, he became part of the very successful primetime soap opera Maging Sino Ka Man with John Lloyd Cruz and Bea Alonzo with Sam Milby and Anne Curtis the series also continued after 6 months later with Maging Sino Ka Man: Ang Pagbabalik the series ended successfully on March 28, 2008 after airing for 3 years.

In 2007, he appeared in the pilot episode of the primetime series, Pangarap na Bituin.

In 2008, he was part of the ABS-CBN and double vision primetime series Kahit Isang Saglit with Jericho Rosales, Carmen Soo, Cristine Reyes, Isabel Rivas and Albert Martinez.

In 2009, he returned to GMA Network for 2 shows Celebrity Duets: Philippine Edition and its Christmas special Sana Ngayong Pasko. He was also part of Lovers in Paris.

In 2010, he was part of primetime fantasy television series Panday Kids and Ilumina.

In 2011, he was cast on afternoon shows such as Bantatay and Captain Barbell on its comeback. He was also a guest on the long-running primetime television series of the year 100 Days to Heaven.

In the 4th quarter of 2011, he was part of the TV5 mini-TV series and political primetime drama Sa Ngalan ng Ina with estranged wife and protagonist in the series Award Winning Actress Nora Aunor.

In 2012, he was part of ABS-CBN's initial drama offering and Primetime TV Series Dahil sa Pag-Ibig, with Jericho Rosales and Piolo Pascual.

In 2013, he had a special participation in Muling Buksan Ang Puso as Anton "El Patron" Silvestre, he played the father of Leonel Beltran played by young actor Enchong Dee.

In 2014, de Leon starred in The Legal Wife with Angel Locsin and Jericho Rosales, and later played as the older version of Jake Cuenca's character in the second season of Ikaw Lamang starring Kim Chiu and Coco Martin.

Acting and influences

He has won the FAMAS Best Actor award five times. He appeared in as lead actor in Lino Brocka's Tinimbang Ka Ngunit Kulang and Eddie Romero's Ganito Kami Noon, Paano Kayo Ngayon?
(he won the FAMAS Best Actor awards for both films). He is also one of the only leading men to work with successful award-winning actress "Mega Star" Sharon Cuneta from 1985 to 2009, for three different studio outfits (Viva Films, Star Cinema and Regal Entertainment) and ex-wife Nora Aunor in 1977–1988 who even guest-starred on his sitcom Goin' Bananas and the longest loveteam with "Star for All Seasons" actress-turned-mayor Vilma Santos who has starred in more than 24 films since in the 1970s all Box-Office they even took the big screen with their captivating performances in 1992' The Dolzura Cortez Story an OctoArts Film Produced and Directed by Laurice Guillen in 1997 they played Ex Lovers in Ike Jarlego Jr.'s Hanggang Ngayon Ika'y Minamahal as their comeback to the bigscreen and 2004' Mano Po 4.

De Leon has also influenced today's biggest actors such as co workers such as Top Leading Man John Lloyd Cruz, Coco Martin, Dingdong Dantes, Aga Muhlach, and Richard Gomez.

Political career

2007 elections
In 2007, he decided to run as Vice Governor of Batangas. This claims that if his former on screen partner, Vilma Santos won the governorship, then he might win as Vice Governor. He was supposed to be the running mate of incumbent Vice Governor Ricky Recto, his on-screen partner's brother-in-law, however, became the running mate of former Batangas Police Director Nestor Sanares. However, he lost to Mark Leviste.

2010 elections
He once again run, but this time for board member of the Second District of Batangas, which he won. Garnering the highest number of votes among those elected, he became Senior Board Member of Batangas.

2013 elections
De Leon was a candidate for the 2nd Congressional District of the Province of Batangas but lost the race to Rep. Mandanas' Chief of Staff, Raneo Abu.

Personal life
De Leon's first marriage was with actress Nora Aunor. The couple, who eventually separated, produced five children  Matet, Lotlot, Ian, Kenneth, and Kiko. De Leon's second marriage is with another actress, Sandy Andolong. The couple produced five children  Rafael, Miguel, Gabriel, Mariel, and Mica.

De Leon is a practicing Roman Catholic.

On March 17, 2020 amidst the COVID-19 pandemic, De Leon announced that he had been diagnosed with COVID-19. He claimed to be asymptomatic and was not in contact with any COVID-19 carriers. He recovered from the disease and was released from the hospital on March 24.

Filmography

Film

Television

Theater
Christopher de Leon has recently started producing theater plays through Green Wings Entertainment. Green Wings' first project is LORENZO, a musical on the life of St. Lorenzo Ruiz, with music by Ryan Cayabyab, book and lyric by Juan Ekis and Paul Dumol with the collaboration of Joem Antonio, and direction by Nonon Padilla. Lorenz Martinez plays Lorenzo Ruiz, the first Filipino saint. LORENZO's maiden run was held in September 2013 at DLS-CSB's SDA Theater.

Albums
1977 – Christopher De Leon
1978 – Sisikat Na Naman?
1979 – In Love with Christopher de Leon
1981 – Ikaw Lamang
1982 – Umaga Na Naman
1983 – Nasaan ang Pangako
1984 – Kung Mangarap Ka't Magising
1985 – Bituing Walang Ningning
1987 – Maligayang Pasko at Masaganang Bagong Taon!
1988 – Kung Mahawi Man ang Ulap
1989 – Umaga Na Naman: The Best of Christopher de Leon
1991 – Ipagpatawad Mo: The Soundtrack
1992 – 8:00 AM Na Naman
1994 – Boyet sings Christopher Cross
1996 – Greatest Hits: Live
1998 – 15 Classic Platinum Hits
2000 – Original Gold
2001 – Premium Gold Collection
2003 – The Platinum Collection
2006 – Mga Awit Pelikula

Awards and nominations

References

External links

 Christopher de Leon to receive Gawad Lino Brocka Award
LORENZO, a musical on St. Lorenzo Ruiz

1956 births
Living people
20th-century Filipino male actors
21st-century Filipino male actors
ABS-CBN personalities
Christopher
Filipino actor-politicians
Filipino male television actors
Filipino people of American descent
Filipino people of American-Jewish descent
Filipino people of German-Jewish descent
Filipino Roman Catholics
Filipino television directors
GMA Network personalities
Intercontinental Broadcasting Corporation personalities
Liberal Party (Philippines) politicians
Male actors from Manila
Members of the Batangas Provincial Board
University of the East alumni
Viva Artists Agency